J. Warren Cassidy (born c. 1931) is a Massachusetts politician who served as the 48th Mayor of Lynn, Massachusetts.

After his term as Mayor of Lynn, Cassidy served as the Executive Vice President of the National Rifle Association.

Notes

  

Mayors of Lynn, Massachusetts
1930s births
Living people